"To Brazil!" is a song by Dutch Eurodance group Vengaboys from their debut studio album Up & Down - The Party Album!. It was released as the album's second single in 1997 by Jive Records. The song incorporates elements from "Aquarela do Brasil", composed by Ary Barroso.

Track listing
Dutch CD single
"To Brazil!" (Radio) – 3:06
"To Brazil!" (Medium Radio) – 3:20
"To Brazil!" (XXL) – 4:31
"Parada de Tettas" (Remix Radio) – 3:59
"Parada de Tettas" (Remix XXL) – 4:44

Charts

2014 remix

On May 14, 2014 Vengaboys released a 2014 version of the song in connection with the 2014 FIFA World Cup in Brazil.

Track listing
Dutch digital download
"2 Brazil!" (Dance Radio) – 2:55
"2 Brazil!" (Hit Radio) – 3:21
"2 Brazil!" (Extended Dance Radio) – 4:21
"2 Brazil!" (Extended Hit Radio) – 3:48
"2 Brazil!" (Hit Radio Instrumental) – 3:21
"2 Brazil!" (Hitradio Instrumental with Brazil Chant) – 3:21
"2 Brazil!" (Like Brazil Remix) – 4:45
"2 Brazil!" (Like Brazil Remix - Edit) – 2:52

Belgian digital download
"2 Brazil!" (Hit Radio Edit) – 3:21
"2 Brazil!" (Dance Radio Edit) – 2:55
"2 Brazil!" (Extended Dance Mix) – 4:21
"2 Brazil!" (Extended Hit Radio) – 3:48
"2 Brazil!" (Hitradio Instrumental with Brazil Chant) – 3:21

German CD single
"2 Brazil!" (Dance Radio) – 2:55
"2 Brazil!" (Hit Radio) – 3:21
"2 Brazil!" (Extended Dance Radio) – 4:21
"2 Brazil!" (Extended Hit Radio) – 3:48
"2 Brazil!" (Like Brazil Remix) – 4:45
"2 Brazil!" (Like Brazil Remix - Edit) – 2:52

Charts

References 

1997 singles
2014 singles
Vengaboys songs
Songs about Brazil
1997 songs
Jive Records singles
Songs written by Ary Barroso
Songs written by Wessel van Diepen
Songs written by Dennis van den Driesschen